Taiqian County is a county in the northeast of Henan province, China, bordering Henan's Fan County to the southwest and Shandong province in all other directions. It is under the administration of the prefecture-level city of Puyang, and generally lies on the north bank of the Yellow River.

Administrative divisions
As 2012, this county is divided to 2 towns and 7 townships.
Towns
Chengguan
Houmiao

Townships

Climate

References

County-level divisions of Henan
Puyang